is a Japanese footballer who plays for Tokushima Vortis.

Career
Raised by Tokushima Vortis youth ranks, Fujiwara was given by manager Ricardo Rodríguez the chance of debuting as a pro in 2018 season, being subbed in for Yuto Uchida in the opening game against Fagiano Okayama at age 17 years and 173 days, making him the youngest debutant in the club’s history. In September 2018, the club announced his promotion to the top team for 2019 season.

Fujiwara had been training with Portimonense S.C. U-23 team from 19 to 31 August and on 4 September it was confirmed, that he had joined the club on loan until the end of the 2019-20 season.

Club statistics
Updated to end of 2018 season.

References

External links
 
 Shiryu Fujiwara at data.j-league.or.jp 
 Shiryu Fujiwara at www.jleague.jp (archive) 
 Shiryu Fujiwara at Tokushima Vortis (archived) 
 Shiryu Fujiwara at playmakerstats.com (English version of zerozero.pt)

2000 births
Living people
Japanese footballers
Japanese expatriate footballers
Association football midfielders
Association football people from Tokushima Prefecture
J2 League players
Tokushima Vortis players
Japanese expatriate sportspeople in Portugal
Expatriate footballers in Portugal